Elvis Presley was an American entertainer who achieved great initial success as a singer and stage performer. He publicly expressed an early career goal of following in the footsteps of his role models James Dean and Marlon Brando to become a top dramatic actor. His manager Colonel Tom Parker's persistent lobbying of William Morris Agency president Abe Lastfogel for a Presley screen test paid off on March 26, 1956, when the singer auditioned at Paramount for a supporting role in The Rainmaker. Although not chosen for the part, he signed a contract with Paramount producer Hal Wallis on April 25 that also allowed him to make films with other studios.

His feature debut was in Love Me Tender in 1956 for 20th Century Fox, with the commercial success of the soundtrack EP being a bellwether for the next three Presley films, Loving You, Jailhouse Rock, and King Creole. Elvis returned to acting after leaving the army in 1960, with G.I. Blues and a dramatic western Flaming Star. The popularity of his romantic musicals established a formula for the coming years. 

Over time, Presley became bitter that his hopes for dramatic roles were not coming to fruition, stating that Clambake was his worst film. He began to complain about the deteriorating quality of the films and his belief that his manager's objectives were more monetary than anything else. At the expiration of all studio contracts, he returned to live entertaining. The two concert documentaries Elvis: That's the Way It Is in 1970 and Elvis on Tour in 1972 were the final theatrical releases for Presley.

Acting credits

Television

Film

Notes

References

See also
 The Pied Piper of Cleveland, an unreleased 1955 short film in which Elvis allegedly appears.

External links
Broadcasting Telecasting (Oct-Dec 1956) at Archive.org
 

Filmography
Male actor filmographies
American filmographies